Habib Mullah Mohamed or Muhammad (born 10 December 1983) is a Ghanaian former professional footballer who played as a left-back.

Club career
Mohamed was born in Tamale. He began his career in 2004 (?). He played for King Faisal Babes in Kumasi, helping the club to play well in the CAF Confederation Cup 2005. He also earned the MVP Award in the quarterfinals. In 2006, Mohamed had trial sessions abroad in Germany and Israel.

After the 2006 World Cup, Mohamed was loaned out to Norwegian club Molde FK, with an option to buy him. He did not play any matches for the club in Tippeligaen, and returned after the 2006 season.

On 25 June 2007, BBC and the Turkish media reported that the 23-year-old has sealed a two-year deal with the Turkish club Ankaragücü after passing a medical test. He was expected to bolster the club's defensive punch next season after sealing the move from local side King Faisal Babes. He was loaned out for six months to Ankaragücü before returning to Ghana in November to Kumasi-based club Asante Kotoko. On 4 January 2008, he moved from Asante Kotoko to All Stars F.C. in a permanent move. He joined to Accra Great Olympics in May and five months later Ashanti Gold. On 19 May 2011, he signed for Globacom Premier League side Bechem Chelsea in Berekum.

International career
Mohamed was called up to the Ghana national team's squad for the 2006 FIFA World Cup. He made two appearances (180 minutes), before he passed after injury.

He lost his place in the national team after the World Cup.

Honours
Best League Defender in Ghana: 2004

References

External links
 Fifa 2006 World Cup Profile
 

1983 births
Living people
People from Tamale, Ghana
Ghanaian footballers
Association football defenders
Ghana international footballers
Ghana A' international footballers
2006 FIFA World Cup players
2009 African Nations Championship players
Süper Lig players
MKE Ankaragücü footballers
Ashanti Gold SC players
King Faisal Babes FC players
Legon Cities FC players
Accra Great Olympics F.C. players
Molde FK players
Ghanaian expatriate footballers
Ghanaian expatriate sportspeople in Turkey
Expatriate footballers in Turkey
Ghanaian expatriate sportspeople in Norway
Expatriate footballers in Norway
Ghanaian expatriate sportspeople in Egypt
Expatriate footballers in Egypt